Zdzisław Strojek (born 6 December 1964) is a retired Polish football midfielder.

References

1964 births
Living people
Polish footballers
Wisła Kraków players
GKS Katowice players
Hutnik Nowa Huta players
Association football midfielders
Polish expatriate footballers
Expatriate footballers in Austria
Polish expatriate sportspeople in Austria